Balazhi (Balajı) is a rural locality (a village) in Kaltovsky Selsoviet, Iglinsky District, Bashkortostan, Russia. The population was 215 as of 2010. There are 4 streets.

Geography 
Balazhi is located 41 km south of Iglino (the district's administrative centre) by road. Chkalovskoye and Slutka are the nearest rural localities.

References 

Rural localities in Iglinsky District